George T. Delacorte Jr. (20 June 1894 – 4 May 1991) was an American magazine publisher, born in New York City.

He founded the Dell Publishing in 1921. His goal was to entertain readers who were not satisfied with the genteel publications available at the time. The company was one of the largest publishers of books, magazines, and comics during its heyday. His most successful innovation was the puzzle magazine.

Biography
Delacorte, born George Tonkonogy, was the son of George Tonkonogy, Sr. and Sadie König, both Jewish immigrants from Eastern Europe. He grew up in Brooklyn with his siblings; Abraham, Mamie, Henrietta, Archibald, Elizabeth, Eugene, and Gertrude.

An alumnus of Columbia University (1913), Delacorte donated money to the university which established the Delacorte Professorship in the Humanities and helped found the George T. Delacorte Center for Magazine Journalism and the creation of the Delacorte Professorship in Magazine Journalism in 1984. The university recognized him with an honorary doctorate in 1982.

In 1962, he donated money to establish the Delacorte Theater in Central Park, New York City. He also donated money for the Delacorte Clock in the park, an Alice in Wonderland sculpture to the north of Conservatory Water with among others the Mad Hatter (whose face is supposedly modeled on that of Delacorte) in honor of his wife, sculptures of The Tempest and Romeo and Juliet, and a fountain in City Hall Plaza.

He died in Manhattan in 1991 at the age of 96, survived by his second wife Valerie Delacorte (whose second husband was the Hungarian producer Gabriel Pascal), two sons, three daughters, 18 grandchildren and 19 great-grandchildren. His siblings included Eugene Tonkonogy.

He is memorialized by several funds in The New York Community Trust, which offers a biographical brochure.

See also
 Dell Comics
 Dell Magazines

References

External links 
 George T. Delacorte Center
 NY Times Obit
Finding aid to George T. Delacorte letters at Columbia University. Rare Book & Manuscript Library.

American book publishers (people)
American magazine publishers (people)
Comic book publishers (people)
American magazine founders
1991 deaths
1894 births
20th-century American philanthropists
Columbia College (New York) alumni